Samara is a female given name. It is of Arabic and Hebrew origin and its meaning is guardian or protected by God. Samara is also a city in Russia. 
Notable people with the name include:

Samara Almeida (born 1992), Brazilian volleyball player
Samara Downs, British ballerina
Samara Felippo (born 1978), Brazilian actress
Samara Golden (born 1973), American artist
Samara Halperin, American artist
Samara Heavrin, American politician
Samara Joy, American jazz singer
Samara Lubelski, American musician
Samara Routerberg (died 2017), American murder victim
Samara Weaving (born 1992), Australian actress and model

Fictional uses of the name include Samara Morgan, the antagonist of the horror film The Ring and its sequels.
Samara or Saamara is an Indian name of Sanskrit origin derived from Sanskrit word " sAmara" सामर which means " with immortals; accompanied by god "
Samara ( सामरा ) is a feminine name. It is also the name of one of the player's companions in the series Mass Effect, a millennia old alien woman dedicated to justice.

See also
 Samra

References

Given names
Feminine given names